Moral Courage is a 1917 American silent drama film directed by Romaine Fielding and starring Muriel Ostriche, Arthur Ashley and Edward Elkas.

Cast
 Muriel Ostriche as Mary McClinton 
 Arthur Ashley as Chadwick Anson 
 Edward Elkas as Joshua Anson 
 Clarence Elmer  as Willie McDonald 
 Robert Forsyth as Angus McClinton 
 Julia Stuart as Nancy Somers 
 Richard Turner as Baggot 
 Edmund Cobb as Walter Green

References

Bibliography
 Langman, Larry. American Film Cycles: The Silent Era. Greenwood Publishing, 1998.

External links
 

1917 films
1917 drama films
1910s English-language films
American silent feature films
Silent American drama films
Films directed by Romaine Fielding
American black-and-white films
World Film Company films
1910s American films